Jazmine Gray (born 23 February 1993) is an American rugby sevens player.

Biography 
Gray was born and raised in Raleigh, North Carolina. She attended Norfolk State University and was an exercise science major. She also played on the college basketball team. She was a personal trainer at a gym that she co-owns with her brother, the Results Fitness Gym. Her rugby career began in 2019 when a client approached her about playing for a local club. A few months later, she was called by the USA Women Sevens team. She made her debut for the US Eagles sevens in 2021.

Gray competed for the United States at the 2022 Rugby World Cup Sevens in Cape Town. They lost to France in the bronze medal final and finished fourth overall.

References 

Living people
1993 births
Female rugby union players
American female rugby union players
United States international rugby sevens players